Plyushchevo is a rural locality (a village) in Yurovskoye Rural Settlement, Gryazovetsky District, Vologda Oblast, Russia. The population was 11 as of 2002.

Geography 
Plyushchevo is located 32 km southwest of Gryazovets (the district's administrative centre) by road. Kuzemkino is the nearest rural locality.

References 

Rural localities in Gryazovetsky District